The 2012 season was Terengganu's 2nd season in the Malaysia Super League, and their 18th consecutive season in the top-flight of Malaysian football. In addition, they were competing in the domestic tournaments, the 2012 Malaysia FA Cup and the 2012 Malaysia Cup

Coaching staff

Kit sponsors

Players 

Terengganu FA squad 2012.

First team squad

Competitions

Super League

The fixtures for the 2012 season were announced on 10 January 2012.

League table

Results summary

Results by round

Matches 

Kickoff times are in +08:00 GMT.

FA Cup

Knockout stage

Quarter-finals

Semi-finals

Malaysia Cup

A total of 16 teams took part in the competition. The teams were divided into 4 groups of 4 teams. The group leaders and runners-up teams in the groups after 6 matches qualified to the quarterfinals.

Group stage

AFC Cup

Group stage

Statistics

See also
 2012 Malaysia Super League season

References

External links
 Facebook Terengganu FA
 Facebook GanuSoccer.Net
 Facebook Terengganu FC
 Facebook UltrasTranung
 Facebook Kelab Penyokong PETEH
 Facebook AnokTranung FC
 Facebook TERENGGANU HANELANG
 Facebook PETEH GANU PETEH

Terengganu FC seasons
Malaysian football clubs 2012 season
Malaysian football club seasons by club